was a regional airline based in the Shiodome City Center complex in Minato, Tokyo, Japan.

It was a wholly owned subsidiary of All Nippon Airways (ANA). Its main base was Tokyo International Airport.

Code data 
In April 2004, Air Nippon adopted ANA flight codes and numbers for all domestic services.

History 

The name Air Nippon was adopted in 1987, and the abbreviation ANK comes from the full, somewhat redundant name Air Nippon Kabushiki kaisha (lit. Air Nippon joint stock corporation.).

It had 12 Boeing 737-200 aircraft. ANA and Air Nippon used different liveries and IATA codes on domestic flights until April 2004, when Air Nippon adopted ANA livery and ANA flight numbers.  As an ANA subsidiary, it is considered a full Star Alliance member. However, on Republic of China flights before April 2008, Air Nippon's IATA code EL was still used due to political reasons and these flights are not considered being Star Alliance flights.

In 1998 the airline was headquartered in Shinagawa, Tokyo.

Shiodome City Center, which became headquarters of Air Nippon and parent company ANA, opened in 2003.

The airline employed 1,686 staff (at March 2007). On 1 October 2010, Air Nippon Network was merged into ANA Wings.

On 1 April 2012, Air Nippon was merged to All Nippon Airways.

Destinations

Fleet 
The Air Nippon fleet consisted of the following aircraft throughout operations:

References

External links

Official website 
Air Nippon Fleet Detail

Defunct airlines of Japan
All Nippon Airways
Airlines established in 1987
Airlines disestablished in 2012
Former Star Alliance affiliate members